Gamini M. Premachandra (24 August 1940 – 24 October 1994) was the Cabinet Minister of Labour and Vocational Training of United National Party government from 1990 to 1994. He was re-elected from the Parliamentary election of 1994. He was assassinated by a female suicide bomber of the Liberation Tigers of Tamil Eelam (LTTE) while attending an election rally in support of Gamini Dissanayake, for the Presidential election of 1994. He was an alumnus of Maliyadeva College, Kurunegala.

See also
Gamini Dissanayake
Mawatagama Electoral District

References

1940 births
1994 deaths
Assassinated Sri Lankan politicians
Chief Ministers of North Western Province, Sri Lanka
Deputy ministers of Sri Lanka
Labour ministers of Sri Lanka
Members of the 8th Parliament of Sri Lanka
Members of the 9th Parliament of Sri Lanka
Ministers of state of Sri Lanka
People killed during the Sri Lankan Civil War
Sinhalese politicians
Sri Lankan Buddhists
Suicide bombings in Sri Lanka
Terrorist incidents in Sri Lanka in 1994
United National Party politicians